Ardnamurchan Point (meaning "the headland of the hill of the great sea") is a peninsula in Highland, Scotland where the Ardnamurchan Lighthouse is situated.

Location
Ardnamurchan Point lies at the western end of the Ardnamurchan peninsula in Lochaber, Highland, Scotland. Ardnamurchan Lighthouse is located on the Point, just over 1 km north of Corrachadh Mòr, the most westerly point on the island of Great Britain, which is a few metres further west than the Point. The nearest settlements are the crofting townships of Portuairk (2km) and Achosnich (3km), and the village of Kilchoan (8km).

The point lies seven miles south of the island of Muck, with Eigg and Rùm a few miles further to the north. Coll is situated nine miles to the west, and Mull is five miles south.

Cultural references
In 1990 the Scottish composer Judith Weir wrote a 10-minute piece for two pianos called Ardnamurchan Point for the pianists Edmund Niemann and Nurit Tilles.

The location is one of the boundary points of the Inshore coastal areas of the United Kingdom, and is mentioned in the Shipping Forecast, broadcast by BBC Radio 4 on behalf of the Maritime and Coastguard Agency.

The lighthouse at Ardnamurchan Point featured in an episode of the BBC TV series, Top Gear, as the destination of a race, where the drivers had to be first to the lighthouse and fit a new bulb. This was Series 30, episode 3.

'Gazing from Ardnamurchan Point to the Hebrides' is a poem composed by Leslie Wheeldon. It is in memory to his much loved wife Kitty. The text of the poem sits in a memorial stone at the summit of Bickerton Hill Cheshire. The memorial is known as Kitty's stone.

Notes

External links
 Ardnamurchan Lighthouse - official site

Headlands of Scotland
Ardnamurchan